Alexandru Simi Caia (born 10 April 2003) is a Romanian professional footballer who plays as a forward for Voința Lupac.

Career statistics

Club

References

2003 births
Living people
Sportspeople from Botoșani
Romanian footballers
Association football forwards
Liga I players
Liga III players
FC Botoșani players
21st-century Romanian people